The Royal Ordnance Factory was a WW2 Ministry of Supply Explosive Factory. It is sited adjacent to the village of Bishopton in Renfrewshire, Scotland. The factory was built to manufacture the propellant cordite for the British Army and the Royal Air Force. It also later produced cordite for the Royal Navy. The Ministry of Works were responsible for the site. It was the biggest munitions factory the MOD had, with up to 20,000 workers.

History
The explosives factory opened between December 1940 and April 1941. It was one of three propellant factories built for the MOD. The others were ROF Wrexham and ROF Ranskill. Manufacturing survived on parts of the Bishopton site until 2002. The site is now owned by BAE Systems, who in conjunction with Redrow Homes, have submitted locally controversial proposals to use the site for building new housing. This development is now underway and is known as Dargavel Village.

Site

Location

The site was built on farm land acquired by compulsory purchase order. Over  of land from up to seven farms was used to accommodate the factory. The land included the Grade B listed Dargavel House and its grounds once owned by the entrepreneur Edward Steinkopff; the house still survives within the site boundary, as well as several former farm houses and public roads that were absorbed into the ROF site. The southern end of the site included land occupied by the former National Filling Factory (a WW1 munitions factory).

Much of the site lies around 10 metres elevation. This was one of the deciding factors for its location, as UK explosives factories were built near to sea level to take account of their favourable microclimates. Some of the site's high-grounds were used for the nitroglycerin hills.

Another reason this site was chosen was because of the area's high unemployment rate in the 1920s and 1930s. This meant there was a ready supply of female labour available to work in the factory. Nearby railway links also played a part in locating the factory at Bishopton.

The site consisted of three, almost self-contained explosive-manufacturing factories; with a common administration group and workshop support service. Building work on the first factory started in April 1937, the second started in April 1939 and the third in October 1939. There was a long delay in opening the first factory due to the critical shortage of a guaranteed water supply. The site has three separate water mains: fire fighting, process water and drinking water. A guaranteed supply of about ten million gallons per day was required.

Factory 0

Every building on the site was numbered; one part of the number code indicated if the building was assigned to Factory 0, 1, 2 or 3. The non-explosive sectors of the site were housed in Factory 0 (mostly nearest to Bishopton itself).

Factory 0 contained most of the supporting services for the site: a permanently staffed fire station with its own fire brigade; clothing department, general stores, laboratories, machine shops, general workshops, laundry, leather workshop, chemical plumber's workshop, carpenter's workshop, and ammunition box stores. It also housed the administration block, a few of the site's many canteens, ambulance station, medical centre, mortuary and the motor transport section.

Factories I, II and III
Factories I, II and III each had their own coal-fired power stations for producing high-pressure steam for generating electricity using steam-turbine-alternators; with the resulting low pressure steam used for site heating and cordite drying. The three power-stations were also interlinked by high-pressure steam mains. Each factory had three nitroglycerin hills, operating on a batch process, to produce nitroglycerin. Factories I and II (and possibly III) had their own nitration plants for making nitrocellulose. Nitroglycerin and nitrocellulose were then processed to produce cordite.

Nearly all the buildings, with the exception of the buildings on the nitroglycerin hills which were light-weight, were steel framed buildings with triple-brick walls and bomb-proof reinforced concrete roofs. Some of the buildings in factory III, which was built last, such as the power station, were clad with corrugated iron to reduce costs.

ROF Bishopton had an RDX plant installed at the site during World War II. The plant was declared redundant to requirements and was dismantled in 1950. It was apparently shipped to Australia and re-erected. Included within the site boundary was an armoured fighting vehicle storage compound. This was linked to the REME repair factory at Linwood.

Railways

The southern end of the site near the River Gryfe was connected to what was then the LMS former Caledonian Railway line. The connection, just north of the former Georgetown railway station, dated back to World War I and the Georgetown Filling Factory. The railway connection was probably severed and the rail tracks lifted when the Inverclyde Line was electrified in the 1960s. Within ROF Bishopton's perimeter fence this line was still there in the 1990s, albeit with 20- to 30-year-old trees growing between the sleepers and rails.

There was also a link from the ROF railway line to the Inverclyde line. The factory had transfer sidings connected to both the up and down lines. The ROF line, which was never electrified, ran on to the transfer sidings a few yards west from the Bishopton station. It crossed Ingleston Road via a gated level crossing, entering the ROF site from the north. The link remained in-situ up until closure of the factory, but was little used after the early 1990s.

The factory had its own fleet of nitric acid wagons and diesel shunting locomotives. The latter were used to move wagons between the transfer sidings and various locations within the site. There was a large fleet of rolling stock and a specialist workshop for maintenance of the locomotives, which were kept in excellent mechanical condition. Much of Bishopton's narrow gauge railway equipment still exists, and can be seen at locations such as the Almond Valley Light Railway (six assorted locomotives) and the Amberley Museum Railway (locomotive No. 12 and several wagons).

Housing
Housing to accommodate the Ministry of Defence Police was provided locally in Bishopton. Two streets were built to provide housing for married police officers - Holmpark and Rossland Crescent. For unmarried police, accommodation was built adjacent to Holmpark; it was used from the 1970s onwards as the MOD Police social club. Some prefabricated houses were also built in Rossland Crescent, but these have since been demolished. Houses for essential staff, such as managers who needed to be on call, were provided on Poplar Avenue. Ingleston Drive may possibly have been built for ROF workers also. A hostel for single women workers was built in Oakshaw Street, Paisley, by the Ministry of Labour.

Privatisation
The workforce fell from about 3,000 in the late 1970s to 2,000 at the time of privatisation in 1984. British Aerospace in 1987 bought the Royal Ordnance Factories. During the 1990s, significant investment was made to the site automating its nitroglycerin, nitrocellulose and nitroguanidine manufacturing plants which improved manufacturing capabilities and process safety. Prior to its closure the site was producing gun and rocket propellant for use in numerous weapons systems. The workforce was about 1,000 in 1991 and was reduced to about 600 in 1993. There was a further reduction in 1996 to 450 employees as the business tried to reduce costs. It was announced in 1998 that the site would close after the loss of a major government contract for the supply of 155mm ammunition to the South African defence contractor, Denel. Manufacture on the site ceased in June 2002.

The MOD Fire Service moved out after privatisation; and the MOD Police moved out after the sale to British Aerospace. Their former social club at Holmpark, with its adjoining sports field, became part of facilities of Bishopton village. The former MOD Police houses at both Holmpark and Rossland Crescent were retained by the Ministry of Defence and were sold off in the mid-1980s to private buyers. As they were still connected to ROF Bishopton's sewage system and water supply they had to be connected to the public systems before they could be sold.

BAE Systems is the current owner of the site. They house a small Environmental Test Facility and Gun Propulsion laboratory at Bishopton. The rest of the ground is being developed into housing.

References

External links
 Cocroft, Wayne (2000). Dangerous Energy: The archaeology of gunpowder and military explosives manufacture. Swindon: English Heritage. .
 Forsythe, R.N. (2005). "The railways of Royal Ordnance Bishopton". In: Backtrack, 19, No. 4. Pages 248–250. .

Cordite
Bishopton
Industrial railways in Scotland
Military history of Scotland
2 ft 6 in gauge railways in Scotland
Royal Ordnance Factories in Scotland
History of Renfrewshire
Category B listed buildings in Renfrewshire